The Bochnia Salt Mine in Bochnia, Poland, is one of the oldest salt mines in the world and is the oldest commercial company in Poland. The Bochnia salt mine was established in 1248 after salt had been discovered there in the 12th and 13th centuries, and became part of the royal mining company, Żupy krakowskie (Kraków Salt Works). In 1990, the mine ceased producing salt but remains a tourist attraction.

In 1981 the Bochnia salt mine was declared a heritage monument. It is one of Poland's official national Historic Monuments (Pomnik historii), as designated on 6 October 2000, and is overseen by the National Heritage Board of Poland.

The chapel in the mine has train tracks running through it.

History 

In 2013, the mine was added to the UNESCO World Heritage List as an extension of the Wieliczka Salt Mine inscription of 1978.

August Passage
The August Passage is the main communication and transportation route in the mine. It runs from the east to the west of the mine, connecting in a straight line the bottom ends of the Campi and Sutoris shafts. The August Passage was initially called the Long Stove (Piec Długi). Its first part, extending between the Rabsztyn Chute and a Campi Shaft, was built from 1723 to 1743, in accordance with a design by Jan Gottfried Borlach. His great achievement was to regulate routes in the mine by ensuring their straightening and leveling.

Excavated chambers, shafts and passages form an underground town, which is open to sightseers. The largest of the preserved chambers has been converted into a sanatorium.

Ważyn Chamber
The Ważyn Chamber was named after the administrator (podżupek) Andrzej Ważyński. The chamber uses no supporting pillars. Salt from Ważyn chamber was extracted from 1697 until the 1950s. For the purposes of creating a sanatorium, these old pits were expanded with a loading-hauling-dumping (LHD) unit machine. This  work took place until 1984. Thanks to them the Ernest Chute from the 17th century impressively presents itself on the stripped chamber's roof.

The air in the chamber is distinguished by its purity. The chamber is equipped with beds: up to 300 people can sleep here. The other parts of Ważyn Chamber are fields for playing volleyball, basketball and handball. There are also restaurant and conference facilities.

See also

 Wieliczka Salt Mine, near Kraków in Poland, central Europe
 Khewra Salt Mine, in Punjab, Pakistan
 Kartchner Caverns State Park in Arizona, the United States
 Grand Roc in Savoie, France, southern Europe
 Salt Cathedral of Zipaquirá, in Zipaquirá, Cundinamarca, Colombia, South America
 Chełm Chalk Tunnels, Poland, central Europe
 Frasassi Cave, Ancona in Italy, southern Europe

References

The Salt Mine in Bochnia
 Kopalnia soli w Bochni

1248 establishments in Europe
13th-century establishments in Poland
1990 disestablishments in Poland
Buildings and structures in Lesser Poland Voivodeship
Salt mines in Poland
Underground mines in Poland
Tourist attractions in Lesser Poland Voivodeship
Museums in Lesser Poland Voivodeship
Salt museums
World Heritage Sites in Poland
Former mines in Poland